Eugene Noble "Buck" Mayer (February 14, 1892 – October 21, 1918) was an American football player.  He played college football at the halfback position for the University of Virginia Cavaliers football team from 1912 to 1915.  In 1915, he became the first football player from a Southern school to be recognized as a consensus first-team All-American. Mayer died during World War I while serving in the United States Army. He was posthumously inducted into the Virginia Sports Hall of Fame in 1980.

Early years
Mayer was born in Norfolk, Virginia, in 1892. His father, Eugene L. Mayer, was a Virginia native who worked in the mill supplies business and later as a merchant in the hardware business. Mayer had three brothers and four sisters.

University of Virginia

Football
Mayer attended the University of Virginia from 1911 to 1916.  While there, he played at the halfback position for the Virginia Cavaliers football team from 1912 to 1915. He won a spot in the starting lineup and impressed sports writers in 1912.

After indicating that he may not return to the University of Virginia in 1913, he was persuaded to do so in September 1913. Mayer and Bob McWhorter were deemed "the class of the backfield men of the south" during the 1913 season.

In 1914, Mayer was one of the leading scorers in the country with 121 points scored (19 touchdowns and five extra points) and led the team to an 8–1 record with its only loss coming to Yale.  On October 24, 1914, scored 26 points (four touchdowns and two extra points) in Virginia's 28–0 victory over Georgia. At the end of the 1914 season, he was named to the All-Southern team by Dick Jemison and W. A. Lambeth.

In 1915, Mayer led Virginia to an 8–1 record, was one of the country's leading scorers with 105 points, and was selected as a first-team All-American by International News Service sports editor Frank G. Menke and Eastern football expert Parke H. Davis. He was the first player from a Southern school to be a consensus first-team All-American.  On October 9, 1915, he scored a school record 37 points five touchdowns and seven extra points in a 74–0 win over Richmond. At the end of the 1915 season, The Washington Herald wrote:Mayer is one of the greatest half backs the South has produced in years, and is universally recognized as such. He scored more touchdowns last year than any other player in the East and the second in the entire United States. His present season was not as rich in scoring as the  one by some touchdowns, but in it he scored thirteen.

During Mayer's four years as a member, the football team compiled a record of 29–6.  He set school records for most points scored in a game (36), most touchdowns in a season (21 in 1914), most career touchdowns (48), and career points scored (312).

Track and field
Mayer was also a member of the Virginia track and field team. He threw the 16-pound shot put 42 feet, 3 inches, ran the 100-yard dash in 10.1 seconds, and had a career best of 22 feet, 9 inches in the broad jump.

In addition to athletics, Mayer was an excellent student who earned a Rhodes scholarship. He graduated from the University of Virginia in 1916 with a law degree.

Family and later years
Mayer was married at Charleston, West Virginia, in March 1916 to Agnes Elizabeth Chilton (1896–1974). After receiving his bachelor of laws degree that year, Mayer began practicing law in Charleston.

During World War I, Mayer served as either a private in the quartermaster's corps and/or in a machine gun company in the United States Army.  In October 1918, he died at age 26 at Camp Joseph E. Johnston in Jacksonville, Florida, a victim of the 1918 flu pandemic. He was survived by his wife and one child. He was buried at the Spring Hill Cemetery in Charleston.

In 1980, Mayer was posthumously inducted into the Virginia Sports Hall of Fame.

References

1892 births
1918 deaths
American football halfbacks
Virginia Cavaliers football players
College men's track and field athletes in the United States
All-American college football players
All-Southern college football players
United States Army personnel of World War I
American Rhodes Scholars
Sportspeople from Norfolk, Virginia
Players of American football from Norfolk, Virginia
Deaths from the Spanish flu pandemic in Florida
American military personnel killed in World War I
United States Army soldiers